Dion Ferrier (born 14 May 1980) is a Guyanese cricketer. He played in nine List A and four Twenty20 matches for Guyana from 2006 to 2008.

See also
 List of Guyanese representative cricketers

References

External links
 

1980 births
Living people
Guyanese cricketers
Guyana cricketers
Place of birth missing (living people)